Haidar Mohammed Alasadi (born November 18, 1986), is  an Iraqi kickboxer. He is the 2013 Asian Indoor and Martial Arts Games Champion, former Arabian Champion, former Asian Champion of 2012 in Kickboxing and qualified for the 2013 World Combat Games but lost at the quarter finals.

Titles and accomplishments
2017 Asian Indoor and Martial Arts Games (-69 kg) Silver medalist 
2017 Asian Kickboxing Championships(63 kg)Bronze medalist 
2016 Arabian Kickboxing Championship (-63 kg) Champion 
2013 Qualified for the 2013 World Combat Games (-63 kg)
2013 Asian Indoor and Martial Arts Games (-63 kg) Champion 
2012 Asian Kickboxing Championships(63 kg)Champion Champion
2011 Arabian Clubs Championship (-63 kg) Silver medalist

Kickboxing record
{{Kickboxing record start|norec=y|title=Amateur Kickboxing Record|record=9 Wins, 5 Losses}}
|- style="background:#fbb;"
| 2017-09-25 || Loss ||align=left| Mostafa Pourfaraj || 2017 Asian Indoor and Martial Arts Games, Point Fighting Final -69 kg || Ashgabat, Turkmenistan || Decision (2-11) || 3 || 2:00
|-
! style=background:white colspan=8 | 
|- style="background:#cfc;"
| 2017-09-25 || Win ||align=left| Khumoyun Farmonov || 2017 Asian Indoor and Martial Arts Games, Point Fighting Semi Finals -69 kg   || Ashgabat, Turkmenistan || Decision (9-8) || 3 || 2:00
|- style="background:#cfc;"
| 2017-09-24 || Win ||align=left| Omar Abu-Rub || 2017 Asian Indoor and Martial Arts Games, Point Fighting Quarter Finals -69 kg   || Ashgabat, Turkmenistan || Decision (13-11) || 3 || 2:00
|-
|- style="background:#fbb;"
| 2017-04-28 || Loss ||align=left| Alisher Akhmedov || 2017 Asian Kickboxing Championships, Point Fighting Final -63 kg || Ashgabat, Turkmenistan || Decision (4-13) || 3 || 2:00
|-
! style=background:white colspan=8 | 
|- style="background:#cfc;"
| 2017-04-27 || Win ||align=left| Biyush Milind Rajhans || 2017 Asian Kickboxing Championships, Point Fighting Quarter Finals -63 kg   || Ashgabat, Turkmenistan || Decision (6-2) || 3 || 2:00
|-
|- style="background:#fbb;"
| 2013-12-03 || Loss ||align=left| Mincho Hadjiev || W.A.K.O. World Championships 2013 (Antalya), Point Fighting 1st Round -63 kg || Antalya, Turkey || Decision (2-12) || 2 || 
|- style="background:#fbb;"
| 2013-10-21 || Loss ||align=left| Ryan Donovan Phillips || 2013 World Combat Games, Point Fighting Quarter Finals -63 kg || St. Petersburg, Russia || Decision (3-13) || 2 || 1:41
|-
|- style="background:#cfc;"
| 2013-07-06 || Win ||align=left| Azamat Abdiraimov || 2013 Asian Indoor and Martial Arts Games, Point Fighting Final -63 kg || Incheon, Korea || Decision (6-2) || 3 || 2:00
|-
! style=background:white colspan=8 | 
|- style="background:#cfc;"
| 2013-07-05 || Win ||align=left| Kim Jun-seong || 2013 Asian Indoor and Martial Arts Games, Point Fighting Semi Finals -63 kg   || Incheon, Korea || Decision (6-4) || 3 || 2:00
|- style="background:#cfc;"
| 2013-07-04 || Win ||align=left| Makarand Joshi || 2013 Asian Indoor and Martial Arts Games, Point Fighting Quarter Finals -63 kg   || Incheon, Korea || Decision (15-7) || 3 || 2:00
|- style="background:#cfc;"
| 2012-12-28 || Win ||align=left| Singh Deepak || 2012 Asian Kickboxing Championships, Point Fighting Final -63 kg || Pune, India || Decision  || 3 || 2:00
|-
! style=background:white colspan=8 | 
|- style="background:#cfc;"
| 2012-12-27 || Win ||align=left| Kim Yoon Jin || 2012 Asian Kickboxing Championships, Point Fighting Semi Finals -63 kg   || Pune, India || Decision  || 3 || 2:00
|-
|- style="background:#fbb;"
| 2011-12-24 || Loss ||align=left| Faisal Al-Turki || 2011 Arabian Clubs Championship, Point Fighting Final -63 kg || Amman, Jordan || Decision  || 3 || 2:00
|-
! style=background:white colspan=8 | 
|- style="background:#cfc;"
| 2011-12-24 || Win ||align=left| Fadi Al-Nehar || 2011 Arabian Clubs Championship, Point Fighting Final -63 kg || Amman, Jordan || Decision  || 3 || 2:00
|-
|-
| colspan=9 | Legend''':

References

1986 births
Living people
Iraqi male kickboxers